Daffiama-Bussie-Issa District is one of the eleven districts in Upper West Region, Ghana. Originally it was formerly part of the then-larger Nadowli District in 1988; until the eastern part of the district was later split off to create Daffiama-Bussie-Issa District on 28 June 2012; thus the remaining part has been renamed as Nadowli-Kaleo District. The district assembly is located in the western part of Upper West Region and has Issa as its capital town.

References 

Districts of Upper West Region